Awaru (also spelled Uru) is a hamlet in northwestern Syria, administratively part of the al-Sawda municipality of the Tartus Governorate, located northeast of Tartus. Nearby localities include al-Sawda to the north, Khawabi to the east, Khirbet al-Faras to the southeast, Bimalkah to the south, Dweir al-Shaykh Saad to the southwest and Husayn al-Baher to the northwest. The inhabitants of the hamlet are Ismailis. Awaru was annexed to the al-Sawda municipality in 1971. It is currently apportioned one seat in the municipality's council of 10 elected representatives.

See also
al-Qadmus
Masyaf

References

Populated places in Tartus District
Ismaili communities in Syria